Jonathan McLaughlin (born September 27, 1982) is an American pop rock singer-songwriter, record producer and pianist from Anderson, Indiana. His debut album Indiana was released on May 1, 2007, preceded by his first EP Industry, also known as Jon McL, in February 2007. His most successful song is the 2008 single "Beating My Heart", from his second album OK Now.

Early life
McLaughlin grew up in Anderson, Indiana, playing piano since early childhood, though he disliked the lessons, and often sought to avoid them. While attending Highland High School, McLaughlin shattered both wrists in an accident that interrupted his musical career. Rediscovering "his muse," McLaughlin attended Anderson University to study music.

Career

McLaughlin released an independent album entitled Up Until Now in 2003. This quickly led to McLaughlin becoming the first artist to sign on with the school's burgeoning record label, Orangehaus Records (now Orangehaus Entertainment). The self-titled album released in 2004 to local and regional praise. He began touring throughout the Midwest and working up a grassroots following.

In 2005, McLaughlin recorded an 8-song EP, Songs I Wrote and Later Recorded. Touring expanded to across the country as support continued to grow for the independent artist. He also increased his fan base by playing at Timber Wolf Lake, a Young Life camp, with his first album entitled Jon McLaughlin. He caught the attention of other independent artists and began touring with artists such as Dave Barnes and Matt Wertz.

In 2005, he signed with record label Island Records. Since then, McLaughlin increased his presence at well-established musical venues and festivals such as Feeling Better Than Everfine (Cleveland, OH), Waterfest (Oshkosh, WI), Milwaukee Summerfest (Milwaukee, WI), Northwest State College Fest (Archbold, OH) and Lollapalooza (Chicago, IL). He has toured with Kelly Clarkson, O.A.R., Sister Hazel, Cowboy Mouth, Paolo Nutini, and Marc Broussard.

Major label debut
After signing with Island Records, McLaughlin increased his public image by providing music for the NBC comedy Scrubs, episode "My Conventional Wisdom," on May 10, 2007. McLaughlin's song, "Human" was included in the episode. The same song appeared at the end of the episode "The Walk-In" of Ghost Whisperer. "Beautiful Disaster" can also be heard in the TV series A Little Thing Called Life in the season two episode titled "The Greatest and Worst Halloween Ever." "Beautiful Disaster" sold over 420,000 digital copies.

To date, three Hollywood-released films have included songs from McLaughlin. The song "Another Layer" appeared on the soundtrack for the motion picture Bridge to Terabithia and "Beautiful Disaster" is used in the 2007 film Georgia Rule. McLaughlin also made an on-screen appearance and performance of the song, "So Close" (written by Alan Menken and Stephen Schwartz) in the Oscar-nominated Disney film Enchanted.

The song received an Oscar nomination. This led to McLaughlin performing at the 80th Academy Awards, which he attended with his wife Amy.

Rising fame, collaborations, Academy Awards

McLaughlin opened on Kelly Clarkson's My December Tour beginning in October 2007, a role announced on The Tonight Show with Jay Leno on August 7, 2007. He has also toured extensively with similarly styled and popular singer-songwriter, Sara Bareilles.

He recorded a trio with Jason Mraz and Van Hunt for the Randy Jackson duets-album Randy Jackson's Music Club, Vol. 1. The track title is "Something to Believe In". McLaughlin's "Human" is also heard in TV Promos for CBS series' Flashpoint.

In 2007, McLaughlin appeared as himself in the film Enchanted starring Amy Adams and Patrick Dempsey singing "So Close", which led to a performance at the 2008 Academy Awards. In 2010, the song was used in Disney California Adventure's World of Color show.

McLaughlin's version of "Smack Into You", written and produced by The-Dream and Tricky Stewart, was leaked to the internet in 2008, but did not appear on OK Now. Beyoncé eventually covered the song and it was featured on her album I Am... Sasha Fierce, re-titled as "Smash Into You".

In June 2008, McLaughlin premiered "Beating My Heart", which was released to mainstream radio on July 22, 2008, prior to being sent to Hot Adult Contemporary (Hot AC) on June 10. "Beating My Heart", first single from his second studio album OK Now, is available with the rest of the album for download on iTunes and Amazon. The song was praised by Billboard single reviews editor Chuck Taylor, who wrote that "It's high time for singer/songwriter Jon McLaughlin to earn his due." He followed this with a description of the song as "a joyous uptempo romantic romp, featuring hook after hook, from tinkling piano to driving percussion and a start-and-stop bridge, alongside a joyous effortless vocal that soars with falsetto to the high heavens. The accompanying video is simple enough, but effectively illustrates McLaughlin's charms as a palatable sex symbol. "Heart" pumps with instantaneous hit potential, and proper promotion of it could propel the artist to superstar status."

McLaughlin co-wrote "Every Time You Lie" and "Falling Over Me" with Demi Lovato for Lovato's second album Here We Go Again in 2009. The latter was originally a duet, but the final version only featured McLaughlin's backing vocals.

Label changes, independent, and new ventures
McLaughlin self-financed and released his third studio album, Forever If Ever, on September 6, 2011. He later signed to record label Razor & Tie and re-released the album as Promising Promises on May 22, 2012, remastering all the tracks and adding three new songs. The first single from the album, "Summer is Over," featured Sara Bareilles and was released on January 10, 2012.

In July 2013, McLaughlin launched a campaign with PledgeMusic, allowing listeners to actively be involved with the making of his new album. The album, Holding My Breath, was released on September 24, 2013, and debuted at No. 26 on the Billboard Independent Albums and No. 141 Billboard 200 charts. It was preceded by the singles "Hallelujah" and "Doesn't Mean Goodbye."

Additionally, he released a set of short films on his YouTube channel ahead of the album's release.

On February 15, 2014, McLaughlin was the opening act for Billy Joel at The Palace of Auburn Hills, (Auburn Hills, Michigan) in addition to the Air Canada Centre in Toronto, Canada stop on March 9, 2014.

In 2015, he announced a new album Like Us with the premiere of his single "Before You" in July. A follow-up single "I Want You Anyway" was released in September. The album Like Us was released on October 9, 2015.

In 2017, he opened for Scott Bradlee's Postmodern Jukebox and Straight No Chaser's "Double Feature" Tour. He also began a new Patreon series called "Dueling Pianos." The following year, he announced a new single "Lost" which preceded his next album Angst & Grace which was released on November 9, 2018.

Personal life 
McLaughlin and his wife, Amy, have two children, Luca and Liv.

Discography

Studio albums

Independent albums

Extended plays

Singles

Other charted songs

Filmography

References

External links

 
 Jon McLaughlin at VH1.com
 Jon McL at NoiseTrade
 Jon McLaughlin Chart History at Billboard

1982 births
American pop musicians
American male singer-songwriters
Anderson University (Indiana) alumni
Living people
Musicians from Anderson, Indiana
Writers from Anderson, Indiana
Island Records artists
21st-century American singers
21st-century American male singers
Singer-songwriters from Indiana